Sakutarō, Sakutaro or Sakutarou (written:  or ) is a masculine Japanese given name. Notable people with the name include:

, Japanese writer
, Japanese anarchist
, Japanese legal scholar

Fictional characters
, a character in the sound novel Umineko no Naku Koro ni

Japanese masculine given names